The 2011 Recopa Sudamericana was the 19th edition of the Recopa Sudamericana, the football competition organized by CONMEBOL between the winners of the previous season's two major South American club tournaments, the Copa Libertadores and the Copa Sudamericana. It was contested between Brazilian club Internacional, the 2010 Copa Libertadores champion, and Argentine club Independiente, the 2010 Copa Sudamericana champion.

Internacional lost the first leg 2–1, but won the second leg 3–1, claiming their second Recopa Sudamericana title.

Qualified teams

Rules
The Recopa Sudamericana is played over two legs; home and away. The team that qualified via the Copa Libertadores plays the second leg at home. The team that accumulates the most points —three for a win, one for a draw, zero for a loss— after the two legs is crowned the champion. Should the two teams be tied on points after the second leg, the team with the best goal difference wins. If the two teams have equal goal difference, the away goals rule is not applied. Extra time is played, which consists of two 15-minute halves. If the tie is still not broken, a penalty shootout ensues according to the Laws of the Game.

Venues

Match details

First leg

Second leg

References

Recopa
Recopa Sudamericana
Recopa Sudamericana 2011
Recopa Sudamericana 2011
Football in Avellaneda